Charles R. Cross is a Seattle-based music journalist, author and editor. He is primarily known for his coverage of Bruce Springsteen, Kurt Cobain and Jimi Hendrix.

Career
He was the Editor of The Rocket in Seattle for fifteen years (1986–2000) during the height of the Seattle music mania. He is also the founder of Backstreets Magazine, a periodical for fans of Bruce Springsteen. His 2001 biography of Kurt Cobain (Heavier Than Heaven) was winner of the 2002 ASCAP Award for Outstanding Musical Biography.

In 2004, while conducting research for his biography of Jimi Hendrix, Cross rediscovered the gravesite of Jimi Hendrix's mother, Lucille Jeter Hendrix, in an abandoned section of Greenwood Memorial Park, where Jimi Hendrix himself is buried in an elaborate granite memorial. The gravesite of Lucille Hendrix was lost because the standard welfare marker of her day, an inscribed brick, became buried in decades of mud from the area's notorious rains. Cross delivered a moving eulogy for Lucille when a proper headstone was dedicated at the site.

Universal Pictures has acquired the rights to Heavier Than Heaven, which is the first film to be made from Cross' work. His Hendrix book has also been optioned.

Books
 1989 Backstreets: Springsteen, the Man and His Music, Harmony Books, New York 1989/1992. .  
 1991 Led Zeppelin: Heaven and Hell, Harmony, 1991. . 
 1998 Classic Rock Albums: Nevermind: Nirvana, Music Sales Group, 1998/2003. .  Coauthored with Jim Berkenstadt
 2001 Heavier Than Heaven: A Biography of Kurt Cobain, Hyperion, 2001. .
 2005 Room Full of Mirrors: A Biography of Jimi Hendrix, Sceptre, 2005. .
 2008 Cobain Unseen, Little, Brown and Company, 2008. 
 2009 Led Zeppelin: Shadows Taller Than Our Souls, It Books. 
 2012 Kicking & Dreaming: A Story of Heart, Soul, and Rock & Roll, HarperCollins, New York, 2012. .  Coauthored with Ann and Nancy Wilson
 2014 Here We Are Now: The Lasting Impact of Kurt Cobain

References

External links
Official Website
 About us page of Backstreets magazine

Year of birth missing (living people)
Living people
American music journalists
American biographers
American male biographers